Below is a list of the 18th century Irish Volunteer corps, alongside details such as their uniform and leaders. Names with an asterisk (*) after them attended the National Convention of 1782.

Generals in 1782
The Earl of Charlemont (commander-in-chief)
Duke of Leinster*
Sir William Parsons*
Sir Barry Denny*
Right Honourable George Ogle*
Right Honourable Henry King*
Sir James Stratford Tynte*

Miscellaneous companies, battalions, and regiments

Miscellaneous Ulster companies
The following Volunteer companies are from the province of Ulster:

Coagh Volunteers
Killead Artillery
Aghadee Artillery
Belfast Horse
Newry Horse
Newton Horse
O'Neills Horse
First Holywood
Carrickfergus Company; founded 3 April 1779; uniform: scarlet, faced pea green; Captain Marriot Dalway; Captain-lieutenant Rice
Killileagh
Lisburn First Company
Rosevale
Ballynahinch
Moira Volunteers; Colonel William Sharman
Loughbriclan Loyalists; Captain Finvey; Captain Hugh Trevor
1st Magherafelt Volunteers; founded: June 1773; uniform: scarlet, faced black; Captain A. Tracy; Lieutenant Richard Dawson; Ensign R. Montgomery
The Inch Infantry, County Down
Castle-Ward Fusileers, County Down
Down Volunteers, County Down
Loyal Ballyleidy Infantry, County Down
Protestant Boys, Down, County Down
Saintfield Infantry, County Down; Captain Nicholas Price
Larne Infantry

Miscellaneous battalions

Belfast Battalion
The following companies are listed as having attended the Belfast Review in 1782. The battalion itself was raised in April 1779, with uniforms meant to be scarlet faced with black. Two principal members were Colonel Stewart Banks and Major Brown.
Belfast First Volunteer Company; founded 17 March 1778; uniform: scarlet, faced black; Captain Waddal Cunningham
Belfast Artillery
Belfast Union; founded 12 June 1778; uniform: scarlet, faced blue; Captain Lyons
Donegore
Holywood
Larne Independents; founded April 1782; uniform: scarlet, faced blue; Captain White
Whitehouse

Coleraine Battalion
The following is a list of Volunteer companies that form part of the Coleraine Battalion that attended the Ballymoney Convention of 1782. At the convention, the battalion was represented by Colonel John Richardson.

Coleraine Company; Captain Lyle
Ballywillen; Captain Cromie
Balrashane; Major Lyle
Dumboe; Captain Haslett
Garvagh; Lieutenant-colonel Canning
Macaskey; Colonel Richardson
Parish of Coleraine; Captain Gault

Dromore Battalion
The following are Volunteer companies that attended the Rathfrilan Review of 19 October 1792.

First Brigade

Represented by Colonel Lord Annesley, and Lieutenant-colonel William Annesley. The companies listed as part of this brigade are all listed as having scarlet uniforms.
Grenadier Company; Captain Magennis
1st Battalion Company; Captain Hodges
2nd Ballyroney; Captain Boyd
3rd Banbridge; Captain Law
4th Banbridge; Captain Fearis
5th Banbridge; Captain Archibald
6th Banbridge; Captain Keowen
7th Paxton Rangers; Captain Paxton
8th Inchigo; Captain Annesley
Light Infantry; Captain Maitland
Gransha; Captain Dick
Rathfrilan Volunteers; Captain Lindsay, Lieutenant John McBride
Rathfrilan Infantry; Captain Lindsay

Second Brigade

Represented by Colonel Vaughan.
Anaghlone; uniform: blue; Captain Paxton
Ballyroney 1st Company; uniform: red; Captain Lowry
Dromore Grenadiers; uniform: red; Captain Campbell
Donaghmore Volunteers; uniform: blue; Captain Carswell
Dromore Volunteers; uniform: red; Captain McComb
Dromore Intrepids; uniform: red; Captain Scott
Dromore Independents; uniform: green; Captain McKey
Dromore Union; uniform: blue; Captain Heyland
Glenville; uniform: blue; Captain A. Scott
Knockmagorm; uniform: blue; Captain McMinn
Villa Independents; uniform: blue; Captain Hamilton
Waringsford 1st Division; uniform: blue; Captain Cowan
Waringsford 2nd Division; uniform: blue; Captain Brush

The following two companies were not in uniform, with two non-uniformed companies noted as not being not in attendance:
Lordship Liberty Volunteers; led by Captain Scott
Grena Volunteers; led by Captain Swan

Glorious Memory Battalion
The following are recorded as attending the Ballymoney Convention of 1782. At it they were represented by Colonel Thomas Morris Jones.

Armoy; Captain Clark
Ballygarvey; Captain Campbell
Ballycastle; Captain Boyd
Ballymena; Captain-lieutenant Hops
Ballymoney Volunteers; Captain Leslie
Clogh; Captain Douglas
Dervock Volunteers; Captain Moore
Grenadier Company; Captain Dick
Kilroghts; Captain Allen (also captain of Loghgeel and Springmount)
Light Infantry; Captain Rogers
Loghgeel; Captain Allen (also captain of Kilroghts and Springmount)
Portglenone Rangers; Captain Simpson
Moneyglass; Captain-lieutenant Brady
Resharkin; Captain-Lieutenant Boyd
Royal Larne Volunteers; Captain-lieutenant Shaw
Springmount; Captain Allen (also captain of Kilroghts and Loghgeel)

Down Regiment
The following companies are listed as being cantoned in Belfast and forming a garrison during the Belfast Review of 1782. At it they were represented by Colonel Stewart.
Bangor Volunteers
Comber Company; led by Orrs, Gillespy, and Andrews
Donaghadee
Dundonald
Newton 1st
Newton 2nd
Newton 3rd
Newton Artillery

Ulster Regiment
At the Belfast Review on 1782, the Ulster Regiment is noted as being divided into two battalions: the Blue Battalion; and the Red Battalion. The following companies are those listed as attending the Belfast Review of 1782. The Blue Battalion was represented by Colonel Rowley.

Blue Battalion
Lisburn True Blue Grenadiers
Lisburn Battalion Company Grenadiers
Lisburn Light Company Grenadiers
Lambeg
Dromore
Maghregell
Ulster Light Artillery

Red Battalion
Ballylesson
Ballynure
Drumbridge
Dunmurry
Purdisburne
Lisburn Fusileers; uniform: scarlet, faced blue; Lieutenant John Kenby

1st Royal Ulster Regiment
The 1st Royal Ulster Regiment (County of Antrim) was commanded at the Belfast Review on 1782 by Colonel O'Neill. Major A. MacManus is also noted as a leader in the regiment. MacManus was requested to act as exercising officer of the Glorious Memory Battalion. Their uniforms are detailed as being scarlet, faced blue with gold lace. The following companies are listed as having attended the Belfast Review 1782.

Ahoghill
Antrim
Braid
Broughshane
Connor
Cullbackey
Portglenone
Randalstown

First Ulster Regiment
The Volunteers of County Armagh formed the First Ulster Regiment, also known as the Armagh Regiment of Volunteers. This regiment contained two battalions: the Northern Battalion; and the Southern Battalion.

References

Irish Volunteer corps